Kyrksten is a locality situated in Storfors Municipality, Värmland County, Sweden with 263 inhabitants in 2020. The settlement is located south of Alkvettern Manor, southeast of the municipal seat Storfors and 13 km (8 mi) northwest of Karlskoga.

References 

Populated places in Värmland County
Populated places in Storfors Municipality